Zenonas Puzinauskas (March 4, 1920 – July 16, 1995) was a Lithuanian basketball player. He won two gold medals with the Lithuania national basketball team during EuroBasket 1937 and EuroBasket 1939.

Biography
Zenonas finished Kaunas Jėzuitai Gymnasium and graduated from Vytautas Magnus University. From 1935, he started to play basketball for Kaunas "Grandies" club. He played for the Lithuania national basketball team twice (1937, 1939) and became Europe champion both times. Aside from being the youngest player on the team, he was also a scholar athlete.

In 1944 he moved to Austria and later to Germany. He worked as a translator in the United States Army and played for Kempton Šarūnas Lithuanian emigrants basketball team. He was an active war refugees' sport organizer, in 1947, in Augsburg, he was nominated as Lithuanian emigrants' Physical Education and Sports Association chairman.  He spoke and read Lithuanian, Russian, Greek, French, Spanish, Italian, English and had a strong command and understanding of ancient Greek and Latin.

In 1951 he moved to the United States and worked at the Young Men's Christian Association (YMCA), Chicago department. Later he worked for the Red Cross. He also was active in emigrants activities.  His wife was Ona Puzinauskas and they had one daughter, Dalia K Puzinauskas (Wendt).

Sources

 Jungtinių Amerikos Valstijų lietuviai. (II t.) – Mokslo ir enciklopedijų leidybos centras, Vilnius, 2002
 Vidas Mačiulis, Vytautas Gudelis. Halė, kurioje žaidė Lubinas ir Sabonis. 1939–1989 – Respublikinis sporto kombinatas, Kaunas, 1989

1920 births
1995 deaths
FIBA EuroBasket-winning players
Lithuanian men's basketball players
Lithuanian emigrants to the United States
Basketball players from Kaunas
Vytautas Magnus University alumni
Lithuanian expatriates in Germany